is a type of Japanese omelette which is made by rolling together several layers of fried beaten eggs. It is often prepared in a rectangular omelette pan called a makiyakinabe or tamagoyakiki.

Preparation 

There are several types of tamagoyaki. It is made by combining eggs, sugar, and soy sauce. Additionally, sake and mirin are used in some recipes.

Alternative versions include "dashimaki tamago" which adds dashi to the egg mix, a stock of dried bonito and kelp, or a version including a mix of shrimp puree, grated mountain yam, sake, and egg, turned into a custard-like cake.

Serving options 
In Japan, tamagoyaki is commonly served as a breakfast dish.

Sushi 
Tamagoyaki is served around the world in the form of nigiri, and also appears in many types of sushi rolls. In the days when most sushi establishments made their own tamagoyaki, known as gyoku in sushi parlance, connoisseur customers would order the tamago sushi prior to starting their meal to assess the sushi chef's skills.

Large futomaki rolls often use tamagoyaki as an ingredient.

Similar dishes 

In Japan, there are several similar dishes to tamagoyaki, such as usuyaki-tamago, kinshi-tamago, and iri-tamago. They differ by their thicknesses, and the manner in which they are fried. Usuyaki-tamago is thinner, kinshi-tamago is a kind of usuyaki-tamago that is cut like fine threads, and iri-tamago is similar to scrambled eggs.

Datemaki (伊達巻) is prepared similarly to tamagoyaki, but incorporates fish paste or hanpen into the batter.

See also
 Gyeran-mari
 Okonomiyaki

References

Japanese cuisine
Japanese cuisine terms
Japanese egg dishes
Omelettes